Inclán is one of fifteen parishes (administrative divisions) in Pravia, a municipality within the province and autonomous community of Asturias, in northern Spain.

The population is 208 (INE 2011).

Villages and hamlets
Fondos de Villa
Godina (Gudina)
Inclán
Masfera
San Esteban
Villameján (Villamexán)

References

Parishes in Pravia